is a Japanese anime television and original video animation series. Produced by Studio 4°C, the series is directed by Yoshiharu Ashino and written by Shinji Obara. Inspired by Through the Looking-Glass, the story follows a young human girl who finds herself trapped in a magical world filled with witches, warlocks, and fairies. In 2003, it was announced at the Tokyo International Anime Fair that the anime Magical Girl Squad Arusu was going to be made. The series first aired between April 9, 2004, and March 4, 2005; in all, 40 episodes were made plus an OVA that contains 6 episodes which were released in 2007.

It was translated and dubbed into English by the anime television network Animax, who broadcast it in its respective networks in Southeast Asia and other regions, and was licensed for distribution in the United States by Media Blasters until 2012. AnimeWorks (Later called Media Blasters) licensed under the English name Tweeny Witches with three DVDs being released in 2008. The OVA titled  was also released on DVD by Media Blasters in 2009.

Plot
A witch soldier named  rescued him and later had a son named  together. Jidan eventually married , with whom he had a daughter named . He taught their young daughter to believe in magic and use magic for happiness, with the True Book of Spells as a present for her 5th birthday.

In the present day, Arusu finds herself in the Magical Realm at the age of 11, summoned by Lennon and the True Book of Spells. Arusu is initially delighted that her dream has finally been granted, however, she is not satisfied with the way of the witches, insisting that magic should only be used to make people happy.

During the evaluation, a huge  attacks the realm, allowing the warlocks to find out that all the fairies have escaped. This causes Atelia to allow Qoo to stay in the realm because she is no longer a failed witch. Afterward, the warlocks invade the realm in search of the True Book of Spells, the 100 fairy species, and a witch, all of which they need to cast dark magic. With the help of the mysterious , Arusu and her group sneak into the Warlock Realm, where science dominates every aspect of life under a new rule. Arusu and her group accidentally reveal themselves as apprentice witches in disguise, forcing them to escape from the police.

During the celebration for the foundation of the Magical Girl Squad, Sheila drugs Arusu to send her on board , a ship carrying failed witches to the Human Realm. After surviving an explosion thanks to the True Book of Spells, Arusu returns to the Magical Realm with Lennon, who calls himself her "mirror". Discarded by his superiors for failure, Sigma becomes cellmates with Jidan and learns of the human's personal history. Eva begins to see a vision of a mysterious old man encouraging her to stay hopeful, causing her magic to become stronger than before.

During a meeting in the chapel, Atelia declares a full-scale war against the warlocks, scapegoating them for the destruction of the Magical Realm. The ensuing war is interrupted by Arusu, who screams to the masses that the witches and warlocks should work together to protect their home realm. The Magical Girl Squad and Lennon are invited by Atelia, who demands the True Book of Spells from them. She reveals that she broke the law of the witches and had a son named Lennon by Jidan, who stole the True Book of Spells 14 years ago, much to Arusu's shock. During a rebellion led by the special task forces, the warlocks mistake Lennon for Arusu and capture him away, threatening to kill both him and his imprisoned father unless he gives them the True Book of Spells. When the witches are approaching to fight back, one of the commanders of the warlocks, declares the humans as a common enemy who keeps dark magic from saving all the citizens of the dying Magical Realm. Encouraged by Arusu, Atelia confesses her treachery and offers herself in exchange for her son, shifting the anger of the masses from him to herself. To get people to trust the humans, Arusu gives Grande the True Book of Spells in exchange for her father and Atelia as promised. During the destruction of Wizard Kingdom, Sigma rescues Arusu and helps her return with her friends, recognizing her as the savior foretold by his late father, who died in defiance of Grande's nefarious plans. Eva suddenly loses her magic and grows weak from the plague that has afflicted many witches and warlocks as a sign of the destruction. The Magical Girl Squad temporarily surrender to Grande and the special task forces, who demand a mina fairy from them. After another visit from the mysterious old man, Eva accepts his offer to restore her magic with the True Book of Spells.

The witches and warlocks scream in despair as the Magical Realm crumbles through the fierce power of dark magic. Grande reveals to Sheila that Eva has darkness in her heart, allowing him to manipulate her into casting dark magic. Realizing that dark magic is made of hate, distrust, and despair, Arusu decides to save her friend despite her betrayal. She feeds Eva a chestnut as a token of their friendship, saving the Magical Realm with the legendary  in the process. Full of new hope for the future, all the witches and warlocks come together as one to rebuild their home realm. Sheila and Eva have the Curse of Eternal Youth removed from themselves by the Grand Master of Witches, who asks Arusu to stay and improve the Magical Realm, which the human girl refuses. After a tearful farewell, one of the interdimensional sirens takes Arusu home to Japan, where she finally reunites with both her parents.

Broadcast and release
In 2003, it was announced at the Tokyo International Anime Fair that the anime Magical Girl Squad Arusu was going to be made. The anime first aired between April 9, 2004, and March 4, 2005; in all, 40 episodes were made plus an OVA that contains 6 episodes which were released in 2007.

It was translated and dubbed into English by the anime television network Animax, who broadcast it in its respective networks in Southeast Asia and was licensed for distribution in the United States by Media Blasters until 2012. It was licensed by AnimeWorks (Later called Media Blasters) under the English name Tweeny Witches with three DVDs being released in 2008. The OVA titled Tweeny Witches: The Adventures was also released on DVD by Media Blasters in 2009. In 2009, a complete collection for both the TV series and the OVA called Tweeny Witches: True Book of Spells was released. In 2010, a complete collection only for the TV series called Tweeny Witches: Core Collection was released. In 2012, a complete collection for both the TV series and the OVA called Tweeny Witches: Complete Collection was released.

Episode list

Original series

The Adventures

Reception
The anime has received mixed feedback from reviewers: Ain't It Cool News said that the anime can be thought of as a "There will be blood" type as well as being "Spicy" structurally. The review goes on to say that the anime fan should "at least give it a try" and "warrants appreciation". Rachael Carothers and Ronald J Duncan from Anime News Network both gave a good review. Ronald said that while the idea of a character traveling to another world and gaining the ability to do magic isn't original, the series is different. He stated the episodes were well paced, had a fun main character, and the artwork was beautiful. Rachael praised the art as "extremely beautiful animation" and background music that "fits in so well". Theron Martin from Anime News Network gave the first DVD a B rating for both the sub and dub and went on to say that it was a "fresh twist on a well-established genre" but it raised animation shortcuts to annoying new levels. Chris Beveridge from Mania.com gave the DVD a mixed review with a C rating. Chris went on to say that the story was "slow moving and stilted"; however, he went on to say that his eight-year-old daughter was "plenty fascinated by it", something the creator was aiming at. Carl Kimlinger from Anime News Network gave the 2nd DVD a B− for both the sub and dub and went on to say that the animation was great and the lead character was "lively" but that the direction was "cold and over complex". The third DVD received a C+ rating from him for both dub and sub, again the artwork was praised but the story was lacking a great deal. For the OVA Carl gave it a B− rating again for both sub and dub. The OVA was praised for its fast pace, action, and adventure, but is "too somber and slow".

Chris Beveridge from Maina.com gave the 2nd DVD a better review stating that the "imagery presented, especially towards the end, was very grandiose and epic" but again cited the pacing of the story as a flaw. For the 3rd and final DVD Chris stated that the ending felt "pretty complete" and was "fairly predictable". He later went on to say that the best moments tended to come with the secondary characters but overall did not capture or hold his attention. Chris rated the OVA as being lighter and more accessible nut at times going over the top, in all the review was good. Chris has placed the anime at #4 of the 10 most underrated anime. Mark Thomas from Mania.com said it is something that parents could get into with their children, and a "little bit of Harry Potter, mixed with some Don Bluth, add a dash of Ralph Bakshi." makes it an odd, but fun, combination.

References

External links
 

2004 anime television series debuts
2005 Japanese television series endings
2007 anime OVAs
Anime and manga based on fairy tales
Anime with original screenplays
Comedy anime and manga
Dark fantasy anime and manga
Fiction about curses
Isekai anime and manga
Magical girl anime and manga
Media Blasters
NHK original programming
Studio 4°C
Television about fairies and sprites
Television series about witchcraft
Witchcraft in anime and manga